Eberhard Klagemann (20 April 1904 – 30 March 1990) was a German film producer. During the 1930s, he worked for UFA as an assistant producer under Erich Pommer and later for 20th Century Fox's German subsidiary. Following the Second World War, Klagemann was issued a license to make films by Pommer, now Film Control Officer for the Allied occupiers of Germany. Pommer judged that he along with several other old colleagues had avoided becoming too closely involved with the Nazi regime: "Certainly all of them have been proven to be no Nazis. Eberhard Klagemann seems to have been cleverly able to also stay away from the Nazis. He surely is an opportunist and therefore should be handled with care. Too bad, because he knows more about our business than all the others".

Klagemann set up a Munich-based firm Klagemann Film and was an important figure in post-war German cinema. He was president of the West German Film Producers' Association. He was in a relationship with the actress Jenny Jugo, and produced several of her films.

Selected filmography 
 Hearts are Trumps (1934)
 Pygmalion (1935)
 The Night With the Emperor (1936)
 Victoria in Dover (1936)
 Dangerous Game (1937)
 The Great and the Little Love (1938)
 A Hopeless Case (1939)
 Nanette (1940)
 Our Miss Doctor (1940)
 Much Ado About Nixi (1942)
 Don't Dream, Annette (1949)
 Royal Children (1950)
 Hanussen (1955)
 Jacqueline (1959)
 Condemned to Sin (1964)

References

Bibliography 
 Bock, Hans-Michael & Bergfelder, Tim. The Concise CineGraph. Encyclopedia of German Cinema. Berghahn Books, 2009. 
 Hardt, Ursula. From Caligari to California: Erich Pommer's life in the International Film Wars. Berghahn Books, 1996.
 Trumpbour, John. Selling Hollywood to the World: U.S. and European Struggles for Mastery of the Global Film Industry, 1920-1950. Cambridge University Press, 2007.

External links 
 

1904 births
1990 deaths
German film producers
People from Wilhelmshaven
Film people from Lower Saxony